Mrs. Dalloway is a novel by Virginia Woolf published on 14 May 1925. It details a day in the life of Clarissa Dalloway, a fictional upper-class woman in post-First World War England. It is one of Woolf's best-known novels.

The working title of Mrs. Dalloway was The Hours. The novel began as two short stories, "Mrs. Dalloway in Bond Street" and the unfinished "The Prime Minister". The book describes Clarissa's preparations for a party she will host in the evening, and the ensuing party. With an interior perspective, the story travels forwards and backwards in time, to construct an image of Clarissa's life and of the inter-war social structure. The novel addresses the nature of time in personal experience through multiple interwoven stories.

In October 2005, Mrs. Dalloway was included on TIME Magazines list of the 100 best English-language novels written since its first issue in 1923.

Plot summary
Clarissa Dalloway goes around London in the morning, getting ready to host a party that evening. The nice day reminds her of her youth spent in the countryside in Bourton and makes her wonder about her choice of husband; she had married the reliable Richard Dalloway instead of the enigmatic and demanding Peter Walsh, and she "had not the option" to be with a female romantic interest, Sally Seton. Peter reintroduces these conflicts by paying a visit that morning.

Septimus Warren Smith, a First World War veteran suffering from deferred traumatic stress, spends his day in the park with his Italian-born wife Lucrezia, where Peter Walsh observes them. Septimus is visited by frequent and indecipherable hallucinations, mostly concerning his dear friend Evans who died in the war. Later that day, after he is prescribed involuntary commitment to a psychiatric hospital, he commits suicide by jumping out of a window.

Clarissa's party in the evening is a slow success. It is attended by most of the characters she has met throughout the book, including people from her past. She hears about Septimus' suicide at the party and gradually comes to admire this stranger's act, which she considers an effort to preserve the purity of his happiness.

Characters
Sir William Bradshaw
A famous psychiatrist to whom Septimus' physician, Dr. Holmes, refers Septimus. Bradshaw notes that Septimus has had a complete nervous breakdown and suggests spending time in the country as a cure.
Clarissa Dalloway
The 51-year-old protagonist of the novel. She is Richard's wife and Elizabeth's mother, and, while reminiscing about her past, spends the day organising a party that will be held that night. She is self-conscious about her role in London's high society.
Elizabeth Dalloway
Clarissa and Richard's 17-year-old daughter. She is said to look "oriental" and has great composure. Compared to her mother, she takes great pleasure in politics and modern history, hoping to be either a doctor or farmer in the future. She would rather spend time in the country with her father than attend her mother's party.
Richard Dalloway
Clarissa's practical, "simple" husband, who feels disconnected from his wife. He is immersed in his work in government.
Miss Kilman
Miss Doris Kilman, originally "Kiehlman", is Elizabeth's schoolmistress for history and is a born-again Christian. She has a degree in history and during the Great War was dismissed from her teaching job because "Miss Dolby thought she would be happier with people who shared her views about the Germans". She has a German ancestry and wears an unattractive mackintosh coat because she is uninterested in dressing to please others. She dislikes Clarissa intensely but loves to spend time with Elizabeth.
Sally Seton
A love interest of Clarissa's, with whom she shared a kiss, who is now married to Lord Rosseter and has five boys. Sally had a strained relationship with her family and spent substantial time with Clarissa's family in her youth. She once could be described as feisty, as well as a youthful ragamuffin, although she has become more conventional with age.
Lucrezia "Rezia" Warren Smith
Septimus' Italian wife. She is burdened by his mental illness and believes she is judged because of it. During most of the novel, she is homesick for her family and country, which she left to marry Septimus after the Armistice.
Septimus Warren Smith
A World War I veteran who suffers from "shell shock" and hallucinations of his deceased friend, Evans. Educated and decorated in the war, he is detached from society and believes himself to be unable to feel. He is married to Lucrezia, from whom he has grown distant.
Peter Walsh
An old friend of Clarissa's who has failed at most of his ventures in life. In the past, Clarissa rejected his marriage proposal. Now he has returned to England from India and is one of Clarissa's party guests. He plans to marry Daisy, a married woman in India, and has returned to try to arrange a divorce from his current wife.
Hugh Whitbread
A pompous friend of Clarissa's, who holds an unspecified position in the British Royal household. Like Clarissa, he places great importance on his place in society. Although he believes he is an essential member of the British aristocracy, Lady Bruton, Clarissa, Richard, and Peter find him obnoxious.

Style
In Mrs Dalloway, all of the action, aside from the flashbacks, takes place on a day in "the middle of June" of 1923. It is an example of stream of consciousness storytelling: every scene closely tracks the momentary thoughts of a particular character. Woolf blurs the distinction between direct and indirect speech throughout the novel, freely alternating her mode of narration between omniscient description, indirect interior monologue, and soliloquy. The narration follows at least twenty characters in this way, but the bulk of the novel is spent with Clarissa Dalloway, Peter Walsh, and Septimus Smith.

Woolf laid out some of her literary goals with the characters of Mrs Dalloway while still working on the novel. A year before its publication, she gave a talk at Cambridge University called "Character in Fiction", revised and retitled later that year as "Mr. Bennett and Mrs. Brown".

Comparisons with Joyce's Ulysses 
Because of structural and stylistic similarities, Mrs Dalloway is commonly thought to be a response to James Joyce's Ulysses, a text that is often considered one of the greatest novels of the twentieth century (though Woolf herself, writing in 1928, denied any deliberate "method" to the book, saying instead that the structure came about "without any conscious direction"). In her essay "Modern Fiction", Woolf praised Ulysses, saying of the scene in the cemetery, "on a first reading at any rate, it is difficult not to acclaim a masterpiece." At the same time, Woolf's personal writings throughout her reading of Ulysses are abundant in criticisms. While in the initial reading process, she recorded the following response to the aforementioned passages,

"I... have been amused, stimulated, charmed interested by the first 2 or 3 chapters—to the end of the Cemetery scene; & then puzzled, bored, irritated, & disillusioned as by a queasy undergraduate scratching his pimples. And Tom, great Tom, thinks this on a par with War & Peace! An illiterate, underbred book it seems to me: the book of a self-taught working man, & we all know how distressing they are, how egotistic, insistent, raw, striking, & ultimately nauseating. When one can have cooked flesh, why have the raw? But I think if you are anaemic, as Tom is, there is glory in blood. Being fairly normal myself I am soon ready for the classics again. I may revise this later. I do not compromise my critical sagacity. I plant a stick in the ground to mark page 20.0"
 —D 2: 188–89

Woolf's distaste for Joyce's work only solidified after she finished reading it. She summed up her thoughts on the work as a whole:

"I finished Ulysses, & think it is a mis-fire. Genius it has I think; but of the inferior water. The book is diffuse. It is brackish. It is pretentious. It is underbred, not only in the obvious sense, but in the literary sense. A first rate writer, I mean, respects writing too much to be tricky; startling; doing stunts. I’m reminded all the time of some callow board schoolboy, say like Henry Lamb, full of wits & powers, but so self-conscious and egotistical that he loses his head, becomes extravagant, mannered, uproarious, ill at ease, makes kindly people feel sorry for him, & stern ones merely annoyed; & one hopes he’ll grow out of it; but as Joyce is 40 this scarcely seems likely. I have not read it carefully; & only once; & it is very obscure; so no doubt I have scamped the virtue of it more than is fair. I feel that myriads of tiny bullets pepper one & spatter one; but one does not get one deadly wound straight in the face—as from Tolstoy, for instance; but it is entirely absurd to compare him with Tolstoy."
 —D 2: 199–200.

The Hogarth Press, run by her and her husband Leonard, had to turn down the chance to publish the novel in 1919 because of the obscenity law in England, as well as the practical issues regarding publishing such a substantial text.

Themes
The novel has two main narrative lines involving two separate characters (Clarissa Dalloway and Septimus Smith); within each narrative there is a particular time and place in the past that the main characters keep returning to in their minds. For Clarissa, the "continuous present" (Gertrude Stein's phrase) of her charmed youth at Bourton keeps intruding into her thoughts on this day in London. For Septimus, the "continuous present" of his time as a soldier during the "Great War" keeps intruding, especially in the form of Evans, his fallen comrade.

Time and secular living 

Time plays an integral role in the theme of faith and doubt in Mrs Dalloway. The overwhelming presence of the passing of time and the impending fate of death for each of the characters is felt throughout the novel. As Big Ben towers over the city of London and rings for each half-hour, characters cannot help but stop and notice the loss of life to time in regular intervals throughout the story. For Septimus, who has experienced the vicious war, the notion of death constantly floats in his mind as he continues to see his friend Evans talking of such things.  The constant stream of consciousness perspective of the characters, especially Clarissa, serves as a distraction from this passing of time and the ultimate march towards death, but each character is constantly reminded of the inevitability of these facts. Further emphasizing the passage of time is the time-frame of the novel, which takes place in the course of a single day, like Joyce's Ulysses.

The idea that there can be meaning in every detail of life, and a deeper appreciation of life as a result, is emphasized by the constant connection of characters to memories and to simple ideas and things. Clarissa even feels that her job (throwing her parties) is to offer "the gift" of connectedness to the inhabitants of London. Woolf's writing style crosses the boundaries of the past, present and future, emphasizing her idea of time as a constant flow, connected only by some force (or divinity) within each person. An evident contrast can be found between the constant passing of time—symbolized by Big Ben—and the seemingly random crossings of time-lines in Woolf's writing. Yet, although these crossings seem random, they only demonstrate the infinite possibilities that the world can offer once it is interconnected by the individual character of each person.

Mental illness
Septimus, as the shell-shocked war hero, operates as a pointed criticism of the treatment of mental illness and depression. Woolf criticises medical discourse through Septimus' decline and suicide; his doctors make snap judgments about his condition, talk to him mainly through his wife, and dismiss his urgent confessions before he can make them. Rezia remarks that Septimus "was not ill. Dr Holmes said there was nothing the matter with him."

Woolf goes beyond commenting on the treatment of mental illness. Using the characters of Clarissa and Rezia, she makes the argument that people can only interpret Septimus' shell shock according to their cultural norms. Throughout the course of the novel Clarissa does not meet Septimus. Clarissa's reality is vastly different from that of Septimus; his presence in London is unknown to Clarissa until his death becomes the subject of idle chatter at her party. By never having these characters meet, Woolf is suggesting that mental illness can be contained to the individuals who suffer from it without others, who remain unaffected, ever having to witness it. This allows Woolf to weave her criticism of the treatment of the mentally ill with her larger argument, which is the criticism of society's class structure. Her use of Septimus as the stereotypically traumatised veteran is her way of showing that there were still reminders of the First World War in London in 1923. These ripples affect Mrs. Dalloway and readers spanning generations. Shell shock, or post traumatic stress disorder, is an important addition to the early 20th century canon of post-war British literature.

There are similarities in Septimus' condition to Woolf's struggles with bipolar disorder. Both hallucinate that birds sing in Greek, and Woolf once attempted to throw herself out of a window as Septimus does. Woolf had also been treated for her condition at various asylums, from which her antipathy towards doctors developed. Woolf committed suicide by drowning, sixteen years after the publication of Mrs Dalloway.

Woolf's original plan for her novel called for Clarissa to kill herself during her party. In this original version, Septimus (whom Woolf called Mrs. Dalloway's "double") did not appear at all.

Existential issues
When Peter Walsh sees a girl on the street and stalks her for half an hour, he notes that his relationship to the girl was "made up, as one makes up the better part of life."  By focusing on characters' thoughts and perceptions, Woolf emphasizes the significance of private thoughts on existential crisis rather than concrete events in a person's life. Most of the plot in Mrs Dalloway consists of realizations that the characters subjectively make.

Clarissa Dalloway is depicted as a woman who appreciates life. Her love of party-throwing comes from a desire to bring people together and create happy moments. Her charm, according to Peter Walsh, who loves her, is a sense of joie de vivre, always summarized by the sentence: "There she was."  She interprets Septimus Smith's death as an act of embracing life and her mood remains light, even though she hears about it in the midst of the party.

Feminism
As a commentary on inter-war society, Clarissa's character highlights the role of women as the proverbial "Angel in the House" and embodies sexual and economic repression and the narcissism of bourgeois women who have never known the hunger and insecurity of working women. She keeps up with and even embraces the social expectations of the wife of a patrician politician, but she is still able to express herself and find distinction in the parties she throws.

Her old friend Sally Seton, whom Clarissa admires dearly, is remembered as a great independent woman – she smoked cigars, once ran down a corridor naked to fetch her sponge-bag, and made bold, unladylike statements to get a reaction from people. When Clarissa meets her in the present day, Sally turns out to be a perfect housewife, having accepted her lot as a rich woman ("Yes, I have ten thousand a year"-whether before the tax was paid, or after, she couldn't remember...), married, and given birth to five sons.

Homosexuality
Clarissa Dalloway feels a strong friendship bond to Sally Seton at Bourton. Thirty-four years later, Clarissa still considers the kiss they shared to be the happiest moment of her life.  She feels about Sally "as men feel," but she does not regard these feelings as signs of same-sex attraction, rather as a very strong friendship.

Similarly, Septimus is haunted by the image of his dear friend Evans. Evans, his commanding officer, is described as being "undemonstrative in the company of women." The narrator describes Septimus and Evans behaving together like "two dogs playing on a hearth-rug" who, inseparable, "had to be together, share with each other, fight with each other, quarrel with each other...." Jean E. Kennard notes that the word "share" could easily be read in a Forsteran manner, perhaps as in Forster's Maurice. Kennard is one to note Septimus' "increasing revulsion at the idea of heterosexual sex," abstaining from sex with Rezia and feeling that "the business of copulation was filth to him before the end."

Adaptations

Dutch film director Marleen Gorris made a film version of Mrs Dalloway in 1997. It was adapted from Woolf's novel by British actress Eileen Atkins and starred Vanessa Redgrave in the title role. The cast included Natascha McElhone, Lena Headey, Rupert Graves, Michael Kitchen, Alan Cox, Sarah Badel, and Katie Carr.

{{Main|The Hours (novel)|l1=The Hours (novel)|The Hours (film)|l2=The Hours (film)|The Hours (opera)|l3=The Hours (opera)}}
A related 2002 film, The Hours depicts a single day in the lives of three women across generations affected by Mrs Dalloway: Woolf writing it in 1923, a Los Angeles housewife reading it in 1951, and a New York literary editor living it in 2001. Adapted from the novel of the same name by Michael Cunningham, the cast features Nicole Kidman as Virginia Woolf, Julianne Moore as housewife Laura, and Meryl Streep as editor Clarissa. Cunningham titled his novel The Hours after Woolf's working title for Mrs Dalloway. A 2022 opera with music by Kevin Puts and libretto by Greg Pierce was based on Cunningham's novel and the film.

Other appearances
Mrs Dalloway also appears in Virginia Woolf's first novel, The Voyage Out, as well as five of her short stories, in which she hosts dinner parties to which the main subject of the narrative is invited:

 "The New Dress": a self-conscious guest has a new dress made for the event
 "The Introduction": whose main character is Lily Everit
 "Together and Apart": Mrs Dalloway introduces the main protagonists
 "The Man Who Loved His Kind": Mrs Dalloway's husband, Richard, invites a school friend, who finds the evening uncomfortable in the extreme
 "A Summing Up": a couple meet in her garden

The stories (except for "The Introduction") all appear in the 1944 collection A Haunted House and Other Short Stories, and in the 1973 collection Mrs Dalloway's Party''.

References

External links

 
 
 Mrs. Dalloway at SparkNotes
 Mrs. Dalloway at the British Library
  
 Character in Fiction

1925 British novels
1920s LGBT novels
Books with atheism-related themes
British novels adapted into films
Hogarth Press books
Modernist novels
Novels by Virginia Woolf
Novels set in London
Dalloway, Clarissa
Dalloway, Clarissa
Novels set in one day
British LGBT novels
Novels about post-traumatic stress disorder
Novels about suicide
Asexuality
Stream of consciousness novels